A Decent Man may refer to:

 A Decent Man (2015 Swiss film) by Micha Lewinsky
 A Decent Man (2015 French film) by Emmanuel Finkiel